Thomas John Madden (25 July 1853 - 26 December 1915) was Archdeacon of Liverpool from 1906 until his death.

Madden was ordained in 1879 and was a curate in Everton. He was metropolitan secretary of the Church Pastoral Aid Society from 1883 to 1885; vicar of St Mark's Barrow-in-Furness from 1885 to 1888; and vicar of St Luke's Liverpool from 1888 to 1906.

His son was killed during the First World War in March 1915. He died in December that year, aged 62.

Notes

1853 births
Clergy from Belfast
Archdeacons of Warrington
Archdeacons of Liverpool
1915 deaths